This is the list of railway stations in Sardinia owned by:
 Rete Ferroviaria Italiana (RFI), a branch of the Italian state company Ferrovie dello Stato;
 Azienda Regionale Sarda Trasporti (ARST).

RFI stations

ARST stations

See also

Railway stations in Italy
Ferrovie dello Stato
Rail transport in Italy
High-speed rail in Italy
Transport in Italy

References

External links

 
Sardinia